The European Concert Hall Organisation (ECHO) is a group of European concert halls who collaborate in the interests of enhancing audiences, exploring music repertoire and stimulating music practice at all levels. Founded in 1991, its primary objectives include the promotion of young artists, the commissioning of new works and the provision of staff training programmes. The organisation also functions as an artistic platform holding regular meetings with artistic directors and fostering the development of a Rising Stars programme in order to facilitate performances by new artists across Europe. The training programme for concert hall staff covers the areas of education, marketing, funding, technique, and artistic management.

Members
As of January 2021, the following concert halls are members of the organisation:

 Amsterdam: Concertgebouw (Amsterdam)
 Athens: Megaron
 Baden-Baden: Festspielhaus Baden-Baden
 Barcelona: L'Auditori
 Barcelona: Palau de la Música Catalana
 Birmingham: B:Music
 Brussels: BOZAR
 Budapest: Müpa - Palace of Arts
 Cologne: Kölner Philharmonie 
 Dortmund: Konzerthaus Dortmund
 Gateshead: The Sage Gateshead
 Hamburg: Elbphilharmonie
 Katowice: Polish National Radio Symphony Orchestra
 Lisbon: Calouste Gulbenkian Foundation
 London: Barbican Centre
 Luxembourg: Philharmonie Luxembourg
 Paris: Philharmonie de Paris
 Paris: Théâtre des Champs-Élysées
 Porto: Casa da Música
 Stockholm: Konserthuset
 Vienna: Wiener Konzerthaus
 Vienna: Wiener Musikverein

References

External links
Official website

Organizations established in 1991
Music venues
Music and the European Union
1991 establishments in Europe